Copelatus andobonicus is a species of diving beetle. It is part of the genus Copelatus in the subfamily Copelatinae of the family Dytiscidae. It was described by Guignot in 1960.

References

andobonicus
Beetles described in 1960